Alabagrus texanus is a species of braconid wasp in the family Braconidae. It develops within the larvae of Herpetogramma theseusalis.  Males emerge from pupation earlier than females. Females typically only mate once, whereas males mate more than once.

References

Further reading

External links

 
 

Parasitic wasps
Insects described in 1872